XK related 9 is a protein that in humans is encoded by the XKR9 gene.

References

Further reading